Patrick Motsa is the deputy commander of the Umbutfo Swaziland Defence Force (USDF). He was appointed to this post in 2000; he was previously Director of Army Staff. He joined the USDF in 1973.

References

1942 births
Swazi military personnel
Living people